Winfred Otto Brockmeyer (September 16, 1907 – March 14, 1980) was an American football coach from Mankato, Minnesota.

Background
Brockmeyer was born in Mankato, Minnesota on September 16, 1907, the son of Otto and Margaret Brockmeyer.  He attended the University of Minnesota where he played football under two legendary college football coaches, Doc Spears and Fritz Crisler.  He played halfback for the Gophers in a backfield that included Bronko Nagurski.  His best college day came in 1928 when he gained 166 yards rushing and but scored all the points in the Gophers' upset of Purdue.  He ran 46 yards for one touchdown and passed for two more and Minnesota won 18-0.

Accomplishments
After his graduation from Minnesota, he played semi-pro ball with the Minnesota All Stars, but his greatest ability was in coaching, and he quickly gave up his player role to concentrate on coaching.  He started at Fergus Falls, Minnesota from 1931 to 1933 and Faribault, Minnesota from 1933 to 1937.   In 1937, he came to Wausau and found a home.  In his 40 years of coaching high school football, his teams had a combined record of 265–43–14.  His record at Wausau High was 230–33–9.  Over those 34 seasons, his team either won outright or shared in 26 conference championships.  "For years he coached basketball, among other sports, and his basketball teams compiled a record of 128 wins against 88 losses, and won the state championship in his first year with the team.

But, it was at football that he really excelled, and Wausau High's record in the early to mid-1940s was unequaled for many years.  In 1939, Wausau won seven games and lost one.  That one was the last game they would lose for years.  In 1940, they not only went undefeated, but outscored their opponents 299 to 12, not giving up a single point until the final quarter of the final game of the year.  In 1941, they went undefeated again and then again in 1943 and in 1945.  They finally lost a game in 1946, with their 46-game winning streak setting a Wisconsin high school record for many years before it was broken in 1987 by Manitowoc Lincoln (48 straight games; 1984-1987) and later by Waunakee (48 games; 2009-2012).  Mr. Brockmeyer's winning percentage of games is .845, making him one of the winningest football coaches in the history of the state of Wisconsin.

Both Football Hall of Famers Elroy Hirsch and Jim Otto learned the basics of football from Brockmeyer when they played for him at Wausau High School.  Brockmeyer is the only man ever to have coached two members of the Pro Football Hall of Fame in high school.  While coaching high school in Minnesota, he also coached another Hall of Fame member, Bruce Smith the only man to win the Heisman Trophy (1941) from the University of Minnesota.

In the 1954 movie Crazylegs the story of Elroy Hirsch, Coach Brockmeyer was played by Hollywood great Lloyd Nolan.  To this day, it is the only Hollywood movie to ever premiere in Wausau.

Mr. Brockmeyer was inducted as a charter member into the Wisconsin Football Coaches Hall of Fame in 1980, and in 1984 was inducted into the National Federation of State High School Associations along with 12 other inductees including Jack Nicklaus and Red Grange.  IN 2004 he was inducted into the National High School Athletic Coaches Association Hall of Fame.

As coach at Wausau High School from 1937 to 1970, Brockmeyer had a 230-33-9 record. He was undefeated in 13 seasons. His teams won 26 conference titles. In the 1940s, he had a 72-2-4 record that included a 46-game winning streak. A scholarship was later inaugurated in his honor.

Personal life
The son of Otto and Margaret Brockmeyer, "Brock" was married on Thanksgiving Day 1932 to Helen Mae Date.  They raised three children.  On March 14, 1980, Mr. Brockmeyer, 72, was on a golf outing in Florida with UW Athletic Director Elroy Hirsch and other members of the UW athletic staff when he was stricken with an apparent heart attack and died.  In a tribute to Wausau, the city which Mr. & Ms. Brockmeyer loved so much, both of them were cremated and had their ashes scattered within the city.

References

1907 births
1980 deaths
American football halfbacks
High school football coaches in Minnesota
High school football coaches in Wisconsin
Minnesota Golden Gophers football players
People from Fergus Falls, Minnesota
Sportspeople from Wausau, Wisconsin
Players of American football from Minnesota